A critic is a person who criticizes, i.e., offers reasoned judgement or analysis, value judgement, interpretation, or observation.

Criticor Criticism may also refer to:
 Critique, systematic inquiry into the conditions and consequences of a concept
 Literary criticism, study, evaluation, and interpretation of literatur
 Opposition Critic, member of the Shadow Cabinet of the Canadian government

Publications
 Critique: Journal of Socialist Theory, a socialist magazine
 Critique (French journal), philosophical journal founded by Georges Bataille
 Middle East Critique. journal for critical studies of the Middle East
 Immanuel Kant's books:
 Critique of Pure Reason or First Critique
 Critique of Practical Reason
 Critique of Judgement
The Critic (1881–1906), an American literary magazine founded by Jeannette Leonard Gilder and Joseph Benson Gilder and merged into Putnam's Magazine
 Critic (magazine), the University of Otago's (Dunedin, New Zealand) student magazine.
 The Critic (Adelaide) (1897–1924), a South Australian weekly arts and society magazine
 The Critics, List of Viz comic strips

See also
The Critic (disambiguation)